Sagawa is a Japanese family name (surname). It may refer to:

People with the surname
Hajime Sagawa, Japanese securities broker involved in the "Olympus scandal" in 2011–12
Issei Sagawa (1949–2022), Japanese man who in 1981 murdered and cannibalized Renée Hartevelt
Keisuke Sagawa (1937–2017), Japanese actor and television personality
Masato Sagawa (born 1943), Japanese scientist and entrepreneur
Ryosuke Sagawa (born 1993), Japanese footballer
Tetsurō Sagawa (born 1937), Japanese actor and voice actor from Tateyama, Chiba

Transport
Sagawa Express, major transportation company in Japan

Soccer
Sagawa Express Osaka S.C., Soccer Club owned by Sagawa Express
Sagawa Express Tokyo S.C., industrial-league football team based on Kōtō district of Tokyo
Sagawa Printing S.C., football (soccer) club based in Muko, Kyoto, Japan
Sagawa Shiga F.C., amateur Japanese football club

Japanese-language surnames